Bernie Bierman was the head football coach at the University of Minnesota for 16 seasons, from 1932 through 1941 and then again from 1945 to 1950.  The team had a 93-35-6 overall record.  In the Big Ten, the Golden Gophers had a 57-28-6 record and won six conference championships.  The team won national titles in 1934, 1935, 1936, 1940 and 1941.  Twenty-one players were awarded All-American status.  Thirty-six players were named All-Big Ten first team.

1932

1933

1934

1935

1936

1937

1938

1939

1940

1941

1945

1946

1947

1948

1949

1950

References

Minnesota Golden Gophers football seasons